Xishui County is a county of eastern Hubei province, People's Republic of China.

History
Xishui was a center of revolutionary activity during the Chinese Civil War. In 1922, an underground group was formed to try to undermine the Kuomintang. Between 1926 and 1949, thousands of locals lost their lives in the struggle.

Famous persons whose ancestral home was Xishui County:
Wen Yiduo ( Chinese: 聞一多), famous writer of China.
Yang Jisheng (historian) ( Chinese traditional: 楊繼繩), the author of Tomb: Great famine of China: 1959-1962( Chinese name: 
< 墓碑:中國1959-1962年三年大饑荒> )
Xu Fuguan, a Chinese historian and philosopher, notable for Confucian studies

Geography

Administrative divisions
Xishui County administers:

Climate

Natural Resources
Xishui county has large proven reserves of ore, including magnetite, vanadium, copper, pyrite, yellow sand, granite, potassium, quartz, green jade, and gold.

Economy
The very first agricultural cooperative in Hubei province was established at Xishui in 1952, as impoverished peasants pooled their land and cattle to create one large farm. In the first year, the commune increased its production by one third. The commune also expanded fresh-water fish and lotus root cultivation, and began planting two crops of rice per year. In 1956, the Xishui cooperative was recognized as an exemplary “national production growth model.” A major flood-control and irrigation reservoir was completed in 1961 and it began generating electricity the following year. This again became a national model for other villages to follow.

Yangtze Flooding
Xishui is subject to flooding from the Yangtze River. In 1996, the main dike wall shielding the village from the Yangtze broke in several places, endangering the entire county. Emergency support personnel from Qichun County and Wuxue City were required to help deal with the emergency. Since then, the dike was widened and raised in height.

References

Xishui Government websites (Chinese)

Counties of Hubei
Huanggang